Faisal Afridi (born 31 December 1977) is a Pakistani cricket umpire and former cricketer. He played 53 first-class and 35 List A matches between 1998 and 2008. He is now an umpire and stood in the match between National Bank of Pakistan and Water and Power Development Authority in the 2017–18 Quaid-e-Azam Trophy on 21 October 2017. In December 2018, he was one of the on-field umpires for the final of the 2018–19 Quaid-e-Azam Trophy.

In October 2021, Afridi was promoted to the International Panel of ICC Umpires, replacing Shozab Raza. He stood in his first Twenty20 International (T20I) match, between Pakistan and England on 23 September 2022.

References

External links
 

1977 births
Living people
Pakistani cricketers
Pakistani cricket umpires
Pakistani Twenty20 International cricket umpires
Place of birth missing (living people)
Khan Research Laboratories cricketers
Sargodha cricketers
Zarai Taraqiati Bank Limited cricketers